The 1921 County Championship was the 28th officially organised running of the County Championship. Middlesex County Cricket Club won their third championship title.

Glamorgan County Cricket Club joined the championship for the first time.

Table
 Five points were awarded for a win.
 Two points were awarded for "winning" the first innings of a drawn match.
 Final placings were decided by calculating the percentage of possible points.

References

1921 in English cricket
County Championship seasons
Welsh cricket in the 20th century